The  is a railway company that provides transportation services in western Aomori Prefecture, Japan. The company operates two regional railway lines: the Kōnan Line, which connects Hirosaki Station in the city of Hirosaki and Kuroishi Station in the city of Kuroishi, and the Ōwani Line, which connects Hirosaki with Ōwani Station on the Ōu Main Line railway. The company also operates an extensive bus network. It is headquartered in the city of Hirakawa.

Between November 1, 1984 and April 1, 1998, the company also operated the Kuroishi Line, a former line of Japanese National Railways.

History
The company was founded on March 27, 1926, and began operations between Hirosaki and Tsugaru-Onoe Station on September 7, 1927. Bus operations began on June 24, 1931, and were divested to a subsidiary company (the forerunner of the Kōnan Bus Company on April 17, 1940.

On July 1, 1948, the Konan line was electrified at 600 VDC. The line was extended to Kuroishi Station by July 1, 1950.

Voltage on the line was raised from 600 VDC to 750 VDC on April 1, 1954 and to 1500 VDC on September 1, 1961.

On October 1, 1970, the Hirosaki Electric Railway was acquired by the Kōnan Railway Company, and its line became the Kōnan Railway Ōwani Line.

On November 1, 1984 the former Japan National Railway Kuroshi Line was privatized by the government and acquired by the Kōnan Railway Company, becoming the Kōnan Railway Kuroishi Line, but was subsequently closed in 1998.

See also
List of railway companies in Japan

References
This article incorporates material from the corresponding article in the Japanese Wikipedia
 Harris, Ken and Clarke, Jackie. Jane's World Railways 2008-2009. Jane's Information Group (2008).

External links

 official home page

Companies based in Aomori Prefecture
Railway companies of Japan
Japanese companies established in 1926